

Sa 

 Jacques Saada b. 1947 first elected in 1997 as Liberal member for Brossard—La Prairie, Quebec.
Romeo Saganash b. 1961 first elected in 2011 as New Democratic Party member for Abitibi—Baie-James—Nunavik—Eeyou, Quebec.
 Jag Sahota b. 1978 first elected in 2019 as Conservative member for Calgary Skyview, Alberta. 
 Ruby Sahota first elected in 2015 as Liberal member for Brampton North, Ontario. 
 Raj Saini b. 1967 first elected in 2015 as Liberal member for Kitchener Centre, Ontario. 
 Harjit Sajjan b. 1970 first elected in 2015 as Liberal member for Vancouver South, British Columbia.
 Ya'ara Saks b. 1973 first elected in 2020 as Liberal member for York Centre, Ontario. 
 Thomas Sales b. 1868 first elected in 1921 as Progressive member for Saltcoats, Saskatchewan.
 Max Saltsman b. 1921 first elected in 1964 as New Democratic Party member for Waterloo South, Ontario.
 Joseph Reed Sams b. 1923 first elected in 1962 as Progressive Conservative member for Wentworth, Ontario.
 Cid Samson b. 1943 first elected in 1988 as New Democratic Party member for Timmins—Chapleau, Ontario.
 Darrell Samson b. 1959 first elected in 2015 as Liberal member for Sackville—Preston—Chezzetcook, Nova Scotia. 
 John Robbins Sanborn b. 1839 first elected in 1891 as Liberal member for Shefford, Quebec.
 Frederick George Sanderson b. 1870 first elected in 1925 as Liberal member for Perth South, Ontario.
 Jasbir Sandhu b. 1966 first elected as New Democratic Party member for Surrey North, British Columbia.
 Ramesh Sangha b. 1945 first elected as Liberal member for Brampton Centre, Ontario.
 Brigitte Sansoucy b. 1963 first elected as New Democratic Party member for Saint-Hyacinthe—Bagot, Quebec. 
Randeep Sarai b. 1975 first elected as Liberal member for Surrey Centre, British Columbia. 
 Terry Sargeant b. 1946 first elected in 1979 as New Democratic Party member for Selkirk—Interlake, Manitoba.
 Bob Saroya b. 1952 first elected in 2015 as Conservative member for Markham—Unionville, Ontario.
 Benoît Sauvageau b. 1963 first elected in 1993 as Bloc Québécois member for Terrebonne, Quebec.
 Arthur Sauvé b. 1874 first elected in 1930 as Conservative member for Laval—Two Mountains, Quebec.
 Jeanne Sauvé b. 1922 first elected in 1972 as Liberal member for Ahuntsic, Quebec.
 Maurice Sauvé b. 1923 first elected in 1962 as Liberal member for Îles-de-la-Madeleine, Quebec.
 Michael Savage b. 1960 first elected in 2004 as Liberal member for Dartmouth—Cole Harbour, Nova Scotia.
 Edmond Savard b. 1862 first elected in 1917 as Laurier Liberal member for Chicoutimi—Saguenay, Quebec.
 Paul Vilmond Savard b. 1864 first elected in 1891 as Liberal member for Chicoutimi—Saguenay, Quebec.
 Pierre Raymond Savard b. 1927 first elected in 1977 as Liberal member for Verdun, Quebec.
 Simon-Pierre Savard-Tremblay b. 1988 first elected in 2019 as Bloc Québécois member for Saint-Hyacinthe—Bagot, Quebec.
 Alfred William Savary b. 1831 first elected in 1867 as Anti-Confederate member for Digby, Nova Scotia.
 Georges-Raoul-Léotale-Guichart-Humbert Saveuse de Beaujeu b. 1847 first elected in 1882 as Conservative member for Soulanges, Quebec.
Denise Savoie b. 1943 first elected in 2006 as New Democratic Party member for Victoria, British Columbia. 
 François Théodore Savoie b. 1846 first elected in 1904 as Liberal member for Mégantic, Quebec.
 Andy Savoy b. 1963 first elected in 2000 as Liberal member for Tobique—Mactaquac, New Brunswick.
 Andrew Saxton b. 1964 first elected in 2008 as Conservative member for North Vancouver, British Columbia.

Sc 

 Francis Scarpaleggia b. 1957 first elected in 2004 as Liberal member for Lac-Saint-Louis, Quebec.
 William Bain Scarth b. 1837 first elected in 1887 as Conservative member for Winnipeg, Manitoba.
 Robert Colin Scatcherd b. 1832 first elected in 1876 as Liberal member for Middlesex North, Ontario.
 Thomas Scatcherd b. 1823 first elected in 1867 as Liberal member for Middlesex North, Ontario.
 Frederick Laurence Schaffner b. 1855 first elected in 1904 as Conservative member for Souris, Manitoba.
 Andrew Scheer b. 1979 first elected in 2004 as Conservative member for Regina—Qu'Appelle, Saskatchewan.
 Jacob Thomas Schell b. 1850 first elected in 1900 as Liberal member for Glengarry, Ontario.
 Malcolm Smith Schell b. 1855 first elected in 1904 as Liberal member for Oxford South, Ontario.
 Ted Schellenberg b. 1952 first elected in 1984 as Progressive Conservative member for Nanaimo—Alberni, British Columbia.
 Gary Schellenberger b. 1943 first elected in 2003 as Progressive Conservative member for Perth—Middlesex, Ontario.
 Stanley Schellenberger b. 1948 first elected in 1972 as Progressive Conservative member for Wetaskiwin, Alberta.
 Hélène Scherrer b. 1950 first elected in 2000 as Liberal member for Louis-Hébert, Quebec.
 Peter Schiefke b. 1979 first elected in 2015 as Liberal member for Vaudreuil—Soulanges, Quebec.
 Jamie Schmale first elected in 2015 as Conservative member for Haliburton—Kawartha Lakes—Brock, Ontario.
 Werner Schmidt b. 1932 first elected in 1993 as Reform member for Okanagan Centre, British Columbia.
 Larry Schneider b. 1938 first elected in 1988 as Progressive Conservative member for Regina—Wascana, Saskatchewan.
 Norman C. Schneider b. 1888 first elected in 1952 as Liberal member for Waterloo North, Ontario.
 Edward Schreyer b. 1935 first elected in 1965 as New Democratic Party member for Springfield, Manitoba.
 James Duncan Schroder b. 1918 first elected in 1980 as Liberal member for Guelph, Ontario.
 Deborah Schulte b. 1960 first elected in 2015 as Liberal member for King—Vaughan, Ontario.
 John Christian Schultz b. 1840 first elected in 1871 as Conservative member for Lisgar, Manitoba.
 Jacob Schulz b. 1901 first elected in 1957 as Cooperative Commonwealth Federation member for Springfield, Manitoba.
 Stanley Stanford Schumacher b. 1933 first elected in 1968 as Progressive Conservative member for Palliser, Alberta.
 Andy Scott b. 1955 first elected in 1993 as Liberal member for Fredericton—York—Sunbury, New Brunswick.
 Craig Scott b. 1962 first elected in 2012 as New Democratic Party member for Toronto—Danforth, Ontario. 
 Frank Stewart Scott b. 1879 first elected in 1915 as Conservative member for Waterloo South, Ontario.
 Geoffrey Douglas Scott b. 1938 first elected in 1978 as Progressive Conservative member for Hamilton—Wentworth, Ontario.
 Michael G. Scott b. 1954 first elected in 1993 as Reform member for Skeena, British Columbia.
 Reid Scott b. 1926 first elected in 1962 as New Democratic Party member for Danforth, Ontario.
 Thomas Scott b. 1841 first elected in 1880 as Conservative member for Selkirk, Manitoba.
 Walter Scott b. 1867 first elected in 1900 as Liberal member for Assiniboia West, Northwest Territories.
 William C. Scott b. 1921 first elected in 1965 as Progressive Conservative member for Victoria, Ontario.
 Jack Scowen b. 1935 first elected in 1984 as Progressive Conservative member for Mackenzie, Saskatchewan.
 Julius Scriver b. 1826 first elected in 1869 as Liberal member for Huntingdon, Quebec.

Se 

 Joseph Emm Seagram b. 1841 first elected in 1896 as Conservative member for Waterloo North, Ontario.
 William Oscar Sealey b. 1859 first elected in 1908 as Liberal member for Wentworth, Ontario.
 Kyle Seeback b. 1970 first elected in 2011 as Conservative member for Brampton West, Ontario. 
 Paul-Arthur Séguin b. 1875 first elected in 1908 as Liberal member for L'Assomption, Quebec.
 Lou Sekora b. 1931 first elected in 1998 as Liberal member for Port Moody—Coquitlam, British Columbia.
 Djaouida Sellah first elected in 2011 as New Democratic Party member for Saint-Bruno—Saint-Hubert, Quebec. 
 Andrew Semple b. 1837 first elected in 1887 as Liberal member for Wellington Centre, Ontario.
 Louis Adélard Sénécal b. 1829 first elected in 1867 as Conservative member for Drummond—Arthabaska, Quebec.
 Mark Cecil Senn b. 1878 first elected in 1921 as Conservative member for Haldimand, Ontario.
 Benoît Serré b. 1951 first elected in 1993 as Liberal member for Timiskaming—French River, Ontario.
 Gaetan Serré b. 1938 first elected in 1968 as Liberal member for Nickel Belt, Ontario.
 Marc Serré b. 1967 first elected in 2015 as Liberal member for Nickel Belt, Ontario. 
 Albert Sévigny b. 1881 first elected in 1911 as Conservative member for Dorchester, Quebec.
 Pierre Sévigny b. 1917 first elected in 1958 as Progressive Conservative member for Longueuil, Quebec.
 Edward James Sexsmith b. 1865 first elected in 1921 as Progressive member for Lennox and Addington, Ontario.
 John Albert Sexsmith b. 1866 first elected in 1908 as Conservative member for Peterborough East, Ontario.

Sg 

 Judy Sgro b. 1944 first elected in 1999 as Liberal member for York West, Ontario.

Sh 

 Noah Shakespeare b. 1839 first elected in 1882 as Conservative member for Victoria, British Columbia.
 Brenda Shanahan b. 1958 first elected in 2015 as Liberal member for Châteauguay—Lacolle, Quebec.
 Walter Shanly b. 1817 first elected in 1867 as Conservative member for Grenville South, Ontario.
 Mitchell Sharp b. 1911 first elected in 1963 as Liberal member for Eglinton, Ontario.
 Samuel Simpson Sharpe b. 1873 first elected in 1908 as Conservative member for Ontario North, Ontario.
 William Henry Sharpe b. 1868 first elected in 1908 as Conservative member for Lisgar, Manitoba.
 Frank Thomas Shaver b. 1881 first elected in 1930 as Conservative member for Stormont, Ontario.
 Alexander Shaw b. 1833 first elected in 1878 as Liberal-Conservative member for Bruce South, Ontario.
 Frederick Davis Shaw b. 1909 first elected in 1940 as Social Credit member for Red Deer, Alberta.
 Hugh Murray Shaw b. 1876 first elected in 1917 as Unionist member for Macleod, Alberta.
 Joseph Tweed Shaw b. 1883 first elected in 1921 as Labour member for Calgary West, Alberta.
 Gail Shea first elected in 2008 as Conservative member for Egmont, Prince Edward Island.
 Charles Sheard b. 1857 first elected in 1917 as Unionist member for Toronto South, Ontario.
 Terry Sheehan b. 1970 first elected in 2015 as Liberal member for Sault Ste. Marie, Ontario. 
 Alex Shepherd b. 1946 first elected in 1993 as Liberal member for Durham, Ontario.
 Francis Henry Shepherd b. 1857 first elected in 1911 as Conservative member for Nanaimo, British Columbia.
 Georgette Sheridan b. 1952 first elected in 1993 as Liberal member for Saskatoon—Humboldt, Saskatchewan.
 Louis Ralph Sherman b. 1926 first elected in 1965 as Progressive Conservative member for Winnipeg South, Manitoba.
 John Sherritt b. 1851 first elected in 1900 as Conservative member for Middlesex North, Ontario.
 Schuyler Shibley b. 1820 first elected in 1872 as Liberal-Conservative member for Addington, Ontario.
 Jack Shields b. 1929 first elected in 1980 as Progressive Conservative member for Athabaska, Alberta.
 Martin Shields b. 1948 first elected in 2015 as Conservative member for Bow River, Alberta.
 Nelly Shin b. 1972 first elected in 2019 as Conservative member for Port Moody—Coquitlam, British Columbia.
 Bev Shipley b. 1947 first elected in 2006 as Conservative member for Lambton—Kent—Middlesex, Ontario.  
 Doug Shipley first elected in 2019 as Conservative member for Barrie—Springwater—Oro-Medonte, Ontario.
 Marie Ann Shipley b. 1899 first elected in 1953 as Liberal member for Timiskaming, Ontario.
 Harry Bernard Short b. 1864 first elected in 1925 as Conservative member for Digby—Annapolis, Nova Scotia.
 John Short b. 1836 first elected in 1875 as Conservative member for Gaspé, Quebec.
 Devinder Shory b. 1958 first elected in 2008 as Conservative member for Calgary Northeast, Alberta. 
 Yuri Shymko b. 1940 first elected in 1978 as Progressive Conservative member for Parkdale, Ontario.

Si 

 Tom Siddon b. 1941 first elected in 1978 as Progressive Conservative member for Burnaby—Richmond—Delta, British Columbia.
 Jati Sidhu b. 1952 first elected in 2015 as Liberal member for Mission—Matsqui—Fraser Canyon, British Columbia.
 Maninder Sidhu b, 1984 first elected in 2019 as Liberal member for Brampton East, Ontario. 
 Sonia Sidhu b. 1968 first elected in 2015 as Liberal member for Brampton South, Ontario.
 Arthur Lewis Sifton b. 1858 first elected in 1917 as Unionist member for Medicine Hat, Alberta.
 Clifford Sifton b. 1861 first elected in 1896 as Liberal member for Brandon, Manitoba.
 Gagan Sikand b. 1984 first elected in 2015 as Liberal member for Mississauga—Streetsville, Ontario.
 Bill Siksay b. 1955 first elected in 2004 as New Democratic Party member for Burnaby—Douglas, British Columbia.
 Mario Silva b. 1966 first elected in 2004 as Liberal member for Davenport, Ontario.
 Jim Silye b. 1946 first elected in 1993 as Reform member for Calgary Centre, Alberta.
 Christian Simard b. 1954 first elected in 2004 as Bloc Québécois member for Beauport, Quebec.
 Georges-Honoré Simard b. 1817 first elected in 1867 as Conservative member for Quebec-Centre, Quebec.
 Henry Simard b. 1836 first elected in 1891 as Liberal member for Charlevoix, Quebec.
 Joseph Alcide Simard b. 1907 first elected in 1965 as Ralliement Créditiste member for Lac-Saint-Jean, Quebec.
 Mario Simard first elected in 2019 as Bloc Québécois member for Jonquière, Quebec.
 Raymond Simard b. 1958 first elected in 2002 as Liberal member for Saint Boniface, Manitoba.
 James Aubrey Simmons b. 1897 first elected in 1949 as Liberal member for Yukon—Mackenzie River, Northwest Territories.
 Oliver Simmons b. 1835 first elected in 1900 as Conservative member for Lambton East, Ontario.
 Roger Simmons b. 1939 first elected in 1979 as Liberal member for Burin—St. George's, Newfoundland and Labrador.
 Scott Simms b. 1970 first elected in 2004 as Liberal member for Bonavista—Exploits, Newfoundland and Labrador.
 John Thomas Simpson b. 1870 first elected in 1930 as Conservative member for Simcoe North, Ontario.
 Robert Simpson b. 1910 first elected in 1957 as Progressive Conservative member for Churchill, Manitoba.
 Thomas Edward Simpson b. 1873 first elected in 1917 as Unionist member for Algoma West, Ontario.
 Wemyss Mackenzie Simpson b. 1825 first elected in 1867 as Conservative member for Algoma, Ontario.
 Jinny Sims b. 1952 first elected in 2011 as New Democratic Party member for Newton—North Delta, British Columbia. 
 Michelle Simson b. 1953 first elected in 2008 as Liberal member for Scarborough Southwest, Ontario.
 Duncan Sinclair b. 1869 first elected in 1925 as Conservative member for Wellington North, Ontario.
 Duncan James Sinclair b. 1867 first elected in 1921 as Liberal member for Oxford North, Ontario.
 James Sinclair b. 1908 first elected in 1940 as Liberal member for Vancouver North, British Columbia.
 John Ewen Sinclair b. 1879 first elected in 1917 as Laurier Liberal member for Queen's, Prince Edward Island.
 John Howard Sinclair b. 1848 first elected in 1904 as Liberal member for Guysborough, Nova Scotia.
 Peter Sinclair b. 1819 first elected in 1873 as Liberal member for Queen's County, Prince Edward Island.
 Peter Sinclair b. 1887 first elected in 1935 as Liberal member for Queen's, Prince Edward Island.
 William Edmund Newton Sinclair b. 1873 first elected in 1945 as Liberal member for Ontario, Ontario.
Nathalie Sinclair-Desgagné first elected in 2021 as Bloc Québécois member for Terrebonne. 
 Jagmeet Singh b. 1979 first elected in 2019 as New Democratic Party member for Burnaby South, British Columbia. 
 John Sylvester Aloysius Sinnott b. 1905 first elected in 1945 as Liberal member for Springfield, Manitoba.
 John Sissons b. 1892 first elected in 1940 as Liberal member for Peace River, Alberta.
 Rathika Sitsabaiesan b. 1981 first elected in 2011 as New Democratic Party member for Scarborough—Rouge River.

Sk 

 Ray Skelly b. 1941 first elected in 1979 as New Democratic Party member for Comox—Powell River, British Columbia.
 Bob Skelly b. 1943 first elected in 1988 as New Democratic Party member for Comox—Alberni, British Columbia.
 Carol Skelton b. 1945 first elected in 2000 as Canadian Alliance member for Saskatoon—Rosetown—Biggar, Saskatchewan.
 Lawrence Wilton Skey b. 1911 first elected in 1945 as Progressive Conservative member for Trinity, Ontario.
 Charles Nelson Skinner b. 1833 first elected in 1887 as Liberal member for City and County of St. John, New Brunswick.
 James Atchison Skinner b. 1826 first elected in 1874 as Liberal member for Oxford South, Ontario.
 John Skoberg b. 1926 first elected in 1968 as New Democratic Party member for Moose Jaw, Saskatchewan.
 Roseanne Skoke b. 1954 first elected in 1993 as Liberal member for Central Nova, Nova Scotia.
 William Skoreyko b. 1922 first elected in 1958 as Progressive Conservative member for Edmonton East, Alberta.

Sl 

 Arthur Graeme Slaght b. 1877 first elected in 1935 as Liberal member for Parry Sound, Ontario.
 Derek Sloan b. 1984 first elected in 2019 as Conservative member for Hastings—Lennox and Addington, Ontario.
 William Sloan b. 1867 first elected in 1904 as Liberal member for Comox—Atlin, British Columbia.
 Joseph Slogan b. 1931 first elected in 1958 as Progressive Conservative member for Springfield, Manitoba.

Sm 
 Clifford Small first elected in 2021 as Conservative member for Coast of Bays—Central—Notre Dame, Newfoundland and Labrador.
 John Small b. 1831 first elected in 1882 as Conservative member for Toronto East, Ontario.
 Robert Hardy Small b. 1891 first elected in 1953 as Progressive Conservative member for Danforth, Ontario.
 Clifford Smallwood b. 1915 first elected in 1958 as Progressive Conservative member for Battle River—Camrose, Alberta.
 Mark Smerchanski b. 1914 first elected in 1968 as Liberal member for Provencher, Manitoba.
 Albert James Smith b. 1822 first elected in 1867 as Liberal member for Westmorland, New Brunswick.
 Alexander Wilson Smith b. 1856 first elected in 1908 as Liberal member for Middlesex North, Ontario.
 Arnold Neilson Smith b. 1889 first elected in 1926 as Liberal member for Stormont, Ontario.
 Arthur Ryan Smith b. 1919 first elected in 1957 as Progressive Conservative member for Calgary South, Alberta.
 Arthur LeRoy Smith b. 1886 first elected in 1945 as Progressive Conservative member for Calgary West, Alberta.
 Benjamin Franklin Smith b. 1865 first elected in 1930 as Conservative member for Victoria—Carleton, New Brunswick.
 Cecil Morris Smith b. 1927 first elected in 1974 as Progressive Conservative member for Churchill, Manitoba.
 David Smith b. 1963 first elected in 2004 as Liberal member for Pontiac, Quebec.
 David Paul Smith b. 1941 first elected in 1980 as Liberal member for Don Valley East, Ontario.
 Donald Smith b. 1905 first elected in 1949 as Liberal member for Queens—Shelburne, Nova Scotia.
 Donald Alexander Smith b. 1820 first elected in 1871 as Independent Conservative member for Selkirk, Manitoba.
 Ernest D'Israeli Smith b. 1853 first elected in 1900 as Conservative member for Wentworth South, Ontario.
 G.A. Percy Smith b. 1922 first elected in 1968 as Liberal member for Northumberland—Miramichi, New Brunswick.
 George Smith b. 1852 first elected in 1905 as Liberal member for Oxford North, Ontario.
 Heber Edgar Smith b. 1915 first elected in 1957 as Progressive Conservative member for Simcoe North, Ontario.
 James A. Smith b. 1911 first elected in 1955 as Social Credit member for Battle River—Camrose, Alberta.
 John Smith b. 1894 first elected in 1957 as Progressive Conservative member for Lincoln, Ontario.
 John Eachern Smith b. 1901 first elected in 1945 as Liberal member for York North, Ontario.
 John James Smith b. 1912 first elected in 1949 as Liberal member for Moose Mountain, Saskatchewan.
 Joy Smith b. 1947 first elected in 2004 as Conservative member for Kildonan—St. Paul, Manitoba.
 Ralph Smith b. 1858 first elected in 1900 as Liberal member for Vancouver, British Columbia.
 Robert Smith b. 1819 first elected in 1872 as Liberal member for Peel, Ontario.
 Robert Smith b. 1858 first elected in 1908 as Liberal member for Stormont, Ontario.
 Robert Knowlton Smith b. 1887 first elected in 1925 as Conservative member for Cumberland, Nova Scotia.
 Sidney Earle Smith b. 1897 first elected in 1957 as Progressive Conservative member for Hastings—Frontenac, Ontario.
 Walter Bernard Smith b. 1912 first elected in 1968 as Liberal member for Saint-Jean, Quebec.
 William Smith b. 1847 first elected in 1887 as Conservative member for Ontario South, Ontario.
 William Murray Smith b. 1930 first elected in 1958 as Progressive Conservative member for Winnipeg North, Manitoba.
 Franklin Smoke b. 1860 first elected in 1925 as Conservative member for Brant, Ontario.
 Henry Smyth b. 1841 first elected in 1882 as Conservative member for Kent, Ontario.
 William Ross Smyth b. 1857 first elected in 1908 as Conservative member for Algoma East, Ontario.

Sn 

 John Goodall Snetsinger b. 1833 first elected in 1896 as Liberal member for Cornwall and Stormont, Ontario.
 George Snider b. 1813 first elected in 1867 as Liberal member for Grey North, Ontario.
 Jabez Bunting Snowball b. 1837 first elected in 1878 as Liberal member for Northumberland, New Brunswick.
 William Bunting Snowball b. 1861 first elected in 1924 as Liberal member for Northumberland, New Brunswick.

So 

 Patrick Sobeski b. 1951 first elected in 1988 as Progressive Conservative member for Cambridge, Ontario.
 René Soetens b. 1948 first elected in 1988 as Progressive Conservative member for Ontario, Ontario.
 Amarjeet Sohi b. 1964 first elected in 2015 as Liberal member for Edmonton Mill Woods, Alberta. 
 Monte Solberg b. 1958 first elected in 1993 as Reform member for Medicine Hat, Alberta.
 John Solomon b. 1950 first elected in 1993 as New Democratic Party member for Regina—Lumsden, Saskatchewan.
 James Somerville b. 1834 first elected in 1882 as Liberal member for Brant North, Ontario.
 James Somerville b. 1826 first elected in 1882 as Liberal member for Bruce West, Ontario.
 Bert H. Soper b. 1884 first elected in 1940 as Liberal member for Lanark, Ontario.
 Robert Sopuck b. 1951 first elected in 2010 as Conservative member for Dauphin—Swan River—Marquette, Manitoba. 
 Francesco Sorbara b. 1971 first elected in 2015 as Liberal member for Vaughan—Woodbridge, Ontario.
 Kevin Sorenson b. 1958 first elected in 2000 as Canadian Alliance member for Crowfoot, Alberta.
 Gerald Soroka first elected in 2019 as Conservative member for Yellowhead, Alberta. 
 Charles Sousa b. 1958 first elected in 2022 as Liberal member for Mississauga—Lakeshore, Ontario.
 Richard Russell Southam b. 1907 first elected in 1958 as Progressive Conservative member for Moose Mountain, Saskatchewan.

Sp 

 William Spankie b. 1859 first elected in 1929 as Conservative member for Frontenac—Addington, Ontario.
 Bobbie Sparrow b. 1935 first elected in 1984 as Progressive Conservative member for Calgary South, Alberta.
 Ray Speaker b. 1935 first elected in 1993 as Reform member for Lethbridge, Alberta.
 Alfred Speakman b. 1880 first elected in 1921 as United Farmers of Alberta member for Red Deer, Alberta.
 James Stanley Speakman b. 1906 first elected in 1958 as Progressive Conservative member for Wetaskiwin, Alberta.
 Robert Speller b. 1956 first elected in 1988 as Liberal member for Haldimand—Norfolk, Ontario.
 David Spence b. 1867 first elected in 1921 as Conservative member for Parkdale, Ontario.
 George Spence  b. 1879 first elected in 1925 as Liberal member for Maple Creek, Saskatchewan.
 Paul-Henri Spence b. 1906 first elected in 1952 as Progressive Conservative member for Roberval, Quebec.
 Henry Elvins Spencer b. 1882 first elected in 1921 as Progressive member for Battle River, Alberta.
 Larry Spencer b. 1941 first elected in 2000 as Canadian Alliance member for Regina—Lumsden—Lake Centre, Saskatchewan.
 Norman Leonard Spencer b. 1902 first elected in 1958 as Progressive Conservative member for Essex West, Ontario.
 Sven Spengemann b. 1966 first elected in 2015 as Liberal member for Mississauga—Lakeshore, Ontario.
 John Drew Sperry b. 1851 first elected in 1909 as Liberal member for Lunenburg, Nova Scotia.
 Chris Speyer b. 1941 first elected in 1979 as Progressive Conservative member for Cambridge, Ontario.
 Edgar Keith Spinney b. 1851 first elected in 1917 as Unionist member for Yarmouth and Clare, Nova Scotia.
 Philip Howard Spohn b. 1842 first elected in 1891 as Liberal member for Simcoe East, Ontario.
 George Spotton b. 1877 first elected in 1927 as Conservative member for Huron North, Ontario.
 Lewis Springer b. 1835 first elected in 1882 as Liberal member for Wentworth South, Ontario.
 Alexander Sproat b. 1834 first elected in 1867 as Conservative member for Bruce North, Ontario.
 John Thomas Sproule b. 1876 first elected in 1930 as Conservative member for Lambton East, Ontario.
 Thomas Simpson Sproule b. 1843 first elected in 1878 as Conservative member for Grey East, Ontario.

St 
Thierry St-Cyr b. 1977 first elected in 2006 as Bloc Québécois member for Jeanne-Le Ber, Quebec.  
Lise St-Denis b. 1940 first elected in 2011 as New Democratic Party member for Saint-Maurice—Champlain, Quebec.
Caroline St-Hilaire b. 1969 first elected in 1997 as Bloc Québécois member for Longueuil, Quebec.
Diane St-Jacques b. 1953 first elected in 1997 as Progressive Conservative member for Shefford, Quebec.
Pierre St-Jean b. 1833 first elected in 1874 as Liberal member for City of Ottawa, Ontario.
Guy St-Julien b. 1940 first elected in 1984 as Progressive Conservative member for Abitibi, Quebec.
Bernard St-Laurent b. 1953 first elected in 1993 as Bloc Québécois member for Manicouagan, Quebec.
Jean-Paul St-Laurent b. 1912 first elected in 1955 as Liberal member for Témiscouata, Quebec.
Louis St-Laurent b. 1882 first elected in 1942 as Liberal member for Quebec East, Quebec.
Pascale St-Onge first elected in 2021 as Liberal member for Brome—Missisquoi, Quebec.
Édouard-Charles St-Père b. 1876 first elected in 1921 as Liberal member for Hochelaga, Quebec.
Lloyd St. Amand b. 1952 first elected in 2004 as Liberal member for Brant, Ontario.
Brent St. Denis b. 1950 first elected in 1993 as Liberal member for Algoma, Ontario.
Gerry St. Germain b. 1937 first elected in 1983 as Progressive Conservative member for Mission—Port Moody, British Columbia.
Paul St. Pierre b. 1923 first elected in 1968 as Liberal member for Coast Chilcotin, British Columbia.
Frank Bainard Stacey b. 1859 first elected in 1917 as Unionist member for Westminster District, British Columbia.
Reginald Stackhouse b. 1925 first elected in 1972 as Progressive Conservative member for Scarborough East, Ontario.
Harold Edwin Stafford b. 1921 first elected in 1965 as Liberal member for Elgin, Ontario.
John Fitz William Stairs b. 1848 first elected in 1883 as Conservative member for Halifax, Nova Scotia.
Robert Stanbury b. 1929 first elected in 1965 as Liberal member for York—Scarborough, Ontario.
Frank Thomas Stanfield b. 1903 first elected in 1945 as Progressive Conservative member for Colchester—Hants, Nova Scotia.
John Stanfield b. 1868 first elected in 1907 as Conservative member for Colchester, Nova Scotia.
Robert Stanfield b. 1914 first elected in 1967 as Progressive Conservative member for Colchester—Hants, Nova Scotia.
George Douglas Stanley b. 1876 first elected in 1930 as Conservative member for Calgary East, Alberta.
John Lawrence Stansell b. 1875 first elected in 1921 as Conservative member for Elgin East, Ontario.
 Bruce Stanton b. 1957 first elected in 2006 as Conservative member for Simcoe North, Ontario. 
Hayden Stanton b. 1898 first elected in 1953 as Progressive Conservative member for Leeds, Ontario.
Joseph Staples b. 1826 first elected in 1872 as Conservative member for Victoria North, Ontario.
William D. Staples b. 1868 first elected in 1904 as Conservative member for Macdonald, Manitoba.
Michael Starr b. 1910 first elected in 1952 as Progressive Conservative member for Ontario, Ontario.
 Gabriel Ste-Marie first elected in 2015 as Bloc Québécois member for Joliette, Quebec.
Louis Sainte-Marie b. 1835 first elected in 1887 as Liberal member for Napierville, Quebec.
George McClellan Stearns b. 1901 first elected in 1958 as Progressive Conservative member for Compton—Frontenac, Quebec.
Paul Steckle b. 1942 first elected in 1993 as Liberal member for Huron—Bruce, Ontario.
James Steedsman b. 1864 first elected in 1921 as Progressive member for Souris, Manitoba.
Michael Steele b. 1861 first elected in 1911 as Conservative member for Perth South, Ontario.
Eric Stefanson, Sr. b. 1913 first elected in 1958 as Progressive Conservative member for Selkirk, Manitoba.
Peter Stefura b. 1923 first elected in 1957 as Social Credit member for Vegreville, Alberta.
Charles Adolphe Stein b. 1878 first elected in 1920 as Liberal member for Kamouraska, Quebec.
 Warren Steinley first elected in 2019 as Conservative member for Regina—Lewvan, Saskatchewan.
Fred Stenson b. 1914 first elected in 1962 as Progressive Conservative member for Peterborough, Ontario.
Michael Thomas Stenson b. 1838 first elected in 1896 as Liberal member for Richmond—Wolfe, Quebec.
George Stephens (Canadian politician) b. 1846 first elected in 1900 as Liberal member for Kent, Ontario.
Charles Elwood Stephenson b. 1898 first elected in 1945 as Progressive Conservative member for Durham, Ontario.
Rufus Stephenson b. 1835 first elected in 1867 as Conservative member for Kent, Ontario.
 Wayne Steski b. 1952 first elected in 2015 as New Democratic Party member for Kootenay—Columbia, British Columbia.
Henry Herbert Stevens b. 1878 first elected in 1911 as Conservative member for Vancouver City, British Columbia.
Sinclair Stevens b. 1927 first elected in 1972 as Progressive Conservative member for York—Simcoe, Ontario.
James Stevenson b. 1827 first elected in 1887 as Conservative member for Peterborough West, Ontario.
Kenneth Ross Stevenson b. 1942 first elected in 1988 as Progressive Conservative member for Durham, Ontario.
Alan Carl Stewart b. 1893 first elected in 1949 as Liberal member for Yorkton, Saskatchewan.
Alistair McLeod Stewart b. 1905 first elected in 1945 as Cooperative Commonwealth Federation member for Winnipeg North, Manitoba.
Charles A. Stewart b. 1868 first elected in 1922 as Liberal member for Argenteuil, Quebec.
Charles Wallace Stewart b. 1885 first elected in 1921 as Progressive member for Humboldt, Saskatchewan.
Christine Stewart b. 1941 first elected in 1988 as Liberal member for Northumberland, Ontario.
Craig Stewart b. 1928 first elected in 1968 as Progressive Conservative member for Marquette, Manitoba.
Dugald Stewart b. 1862 first elected in 1911 as Conservative member for Lunenburg, Nova Scotia.
Duncan Alexander Stewart b. 1850 first elected in 1902 as Liberal member for Lisgar, Manitoba.
Hugh Alexander Stewart b. 1871 first elected in 1921 as Conservative member for Leeds, Ontario.
Jake Stewart b. 1978 first elected in 2021 as Conservative member for Miramichi—Grand Lake, New Brunswick. 
Jane Stewart b. 1955 first elected in 1993 as Liberal member for Brant, Ontario.
John Alexander Stewart b. 1867 first elected in 1918 as Unionist member for Lanark, Ontario.
John Benjamin Stewart b. 1924 first elected in 1962 as Liberal member for Antigonish—Guysborough, Nova Scotia.
John Smith Stewart b. 1878 first elected in 1930 as Conservative member for Lethbridge, Alberta.
Kennedy Stewart b. 1966 first elected in 2011 as New Democratic Party member for Burnaby—Douglas, British Columbia. 
Ralph Wesley Stewart b. 1929 first elected in 1968 as Liberal member for Cochrane, Ontario.
Robert Stewart b. 1850 first elected in 1904 as Liberal member for City of Ottawa, Ontario.
Robert Dugald Caldwell Stewart b. 1907 first elected in 1958 as Progressive Conservative member for Charlotte, New Brunswick.
Ronald Alexander Stewart b. 1927 first elected in 1979 as Progressive Conservative member for Simcoe South, Ontario.
Thomas Joseph Stewart b. 1848 first elected in 1908 as Conservative member for Hamilton West, Ontario.
William Douglas Stewart b. 1938 first elected in 1968 as Liberal member for Okanagan—Kootenay, British Columbia.
Leonard T. Stick b. 1892 first elected in 1949 as Liberal member for Trinity—Conception, Newfoundland and Labrador.
Darrel Stinson b. 1945 first elected in 1993 as Reform member for Okanagan—Shuswap, British Columbia.
Frederick Coles Stinson b. 1922 first elected in 1957 as Progressive Conservative member for York Centre, Ontario.
Thomas Hubert Stinson b. 1883 first elected in 1925 as Conservative member for Victoria, Ontario.
Grote Stirling b. 1875 first elected in 1924 as Conservative member for Yale, British Columbia.
David Stirton b. 1816 first elected in 1867 as Liberal member for Wellington South, Ontario.
Bernard Munroe Stitt b. 1880 first elected in 1930 as Conservative member for Nelson, Manitoba.
James Herbert Stitt b. 1891 first elected in 1930 as Conservative member for Selkirk, Manitoba.
Alfred Augustus Stockton b. 1842 first elected in 1904 as Conservative member for City and County of St. John, New Brunswick.
Peter Stoffer b. 1956 first elected in 1997 as New Democratic Party member for Sackville—Eastern Shore, Nova Scotia.
George Henry Stokes b. 1876 first elected in 1940 as National Government member for Hastings South, Ontario.
Peter Alan Stollery b. 1935 first elected in 1972 as Liberal member for Spadina, Ontario.
Alfred Stork b. 1871 first elected in 1921 as Liberal member for Skeena, British Columbia.
Brian Storseth b. 1978 first elected in 2006 as Conservative member for Westlock—St. Paul, Alberta. 
Chuck Strahl b. 1957 first elected in 1993 as Reform member for Fraser Valley East, British Columbia.
Mark Strahl b. 1978 first elected in 2011 as Conservative member for Chilliwack—Fraser Canyon, British Columbia. 
Frederick William Strange b. 1844 first elected in 1878 as Liberal-Conservative member for York North, Ontario.
Diane Stratas b. 1932 first elected in 1979 as Progressive Conservative member for Scarborough Centre, Ontario.
James Robert Stratton b. 1858 first elected in 1908 as Liberal member for Peterborough West, Ontario.
Thomas Clark Street b. 1814 first elected in 1867 as Conservative member for Welland, Ontario.
John Everett Lyle Streight b. 1880 first elected in 1935 as Liberal member for York West, Ontario.
Belinda Stronach b. 1966 first elected in 2004 as Conservative member for Newmarket—Aurora, Ontario.
Gladys Grace Mae Strum b. 1906 first elected in 1945 as Cooperative Commonwealth Federation member for Qu'Appelle, Saskatchewan.
Andrew Wesley Stuart b. 1902 first elected in 1945 as Liberal member for Charlotte, New Brunswick.
John Stuart b. 1830 first elected in 1874 as Liberal member for Norfolk South, Ontario.
 Shannon Stubbs b. 1979 first elected in 2015 as Conservative member for Lakeland, Alberta.
William Stubbs b. 1847 first elected in 1895 as Independent Conservative member for Cardwell, Ontario.
Irvin William Studer b. 1900 first elected in 1949 as Liberal member for Maple Creek, Saskatchewan.
David Stupich b. 1921 first elected in 1988 as New Democratic Party member for Nanaimo—Cowichan, British Columbia.

Su 
 Jenna Sudds b. 1979 first elected in 2021 as Liberal member for Kanata—Carleton, Ontario. 
 Allen Sulatycky b. 1938 first elected in 1968 as Liberal member for Rocky Mountain, Alberta.
 Gordon Joseph Sullivan b. 1920 first elected in 1968 as Liberal member for Hamilton Mountain, Ontario.
 John Alexander Sullivan b. 1879 first elected in 1930 as Conservative member for St. Ann, Quebec.
 Mike Sullivan b. 1952 first elected in 2011 as New Democratic Party member for York South—Weston, Ontario. 
 Thomas Suluk b. 1950 first elected in 1984 as Progressive Conservative member for Nunatsiaq, Northwest Territories.
 Donald Sutherland b. 1863 first elected in 1911 as Conservative member for Oxford South, Ontario.
 Donald Matheson Sutherland b. 1879 first elected in 1925 as Conservative member for Oxford North, Ontario.
 Hugh McKay Sutherland b. 1843 first elected in 1882 as Liberal member for Selkirk, Manitoba.
 James Sutherland b. 1849 first elected in 1880 as Liberal member for Oxford North, Ontario.
 Robert Franklin Sutherland b. 1859 first elected in 1900 as Liberal member for Essex North, Ontario.

Sw 

 James Beck Swanston b. 1878 first elected in 1930 as Conservative member for Maple Creek, Saskatchewan.
 David Sweet b. 1957 first elected in 2006 as Conservative member for Ancaster—Dundas—Flamborough—Westdale, Ontario.

Sy 

 George Sylvain b. 1819 first elected in 1867 as Conservative member for Rimouski, Quebec.
 Armand Sylvestre b. 1890 first elected in 1925 as Liberal member for Lake St. John, Quebec.
 Cyril Symes b. 1943 first elected in 1972 as New Democratic Party member for Sault Ste. Marie, Ontario.

Sz 

 Paul Szabo b. 1948 first elected in 1993 as Liberal member for Mississauga South, Ontario.

S